Tajikistan first competed at the Asian Games in 1994.

Medal tables

Medals by Asian Games

Medals by games

Asian Games

Medals by sport

Asian Games

Multiple Asian Games gold medalists

This is a list of multiple Asian Games gold medalists for Tajikistan, listing people who have won more than two gold medals.

Athletes in bold are still active.

References